With Roots Above and Branches Below is the third studio album by American metalcore band The Devil Wears Prada. The album was released on May 5, 2009, through Ferret Music. It charted at No. 11 on the Billboard 200, selling 31,000 in its first week.

Background and recording
The Devil Wears Prada began writing for With Roots Above And Branches Below after attending 2008's Warped Tour. They started performing "I Hate Buffering" for live audiences for the remainder of the tours they were on that year. They began production and recording of the album during early 2009, while so, vocalist Mike Hranica stated "We're really excited for this album. It's definitely going to be darker, heavier, and more epic. Expect a much heavier, more metal record." Drummer Daniel Williams stated that the new album would be "wilder and crazier" with songs that would features new elements such as choruses, and James Baney stated that the album would be more mechanical, but that it would still contain their same distinct style.

Promotion and release
The first material released from the album was the song "Dez Moines". It was uploaded to the band's MySpace profile on March 13, 2009, and was released as a free download for fans. On the band's co-headlining US tour with A Day to Remember, Emarosa and Sky Eats Airplane, they offered fans special download cards for the songs "Dez Moines" and "Assistant to the Regional Manager".

"Dez Moines" is also available as downloadable content for the video game Guitar Hero World Tour and was released on May 7, 2009, as a part of the Ferret/Metal Blade Records Pack.

With Roots Above and Branches Below was released on May 5, 2009, through Ferret Music. The album was released in two editions; a standard version and a deluxe CD/DVD version. The deluxe CD/DVD includes the disc and a DVD that contains a making of the album that also premiered online. There are some clips that were deleted after being presented for a short time online that are also featured on the DVD. The album cover artwork was illustrated by Dan Seagrave, who is well known for his work for metal acts including Morbid Angel, Suffocation and Demon Hunter.

The music video for the song "Danger: Wildman" was released on August 4, 2009, and the video for "Assistant to the Regional Manager" was released April 6, 2010.

Critical reception

The album entered the Billboard 200 at number 11 with sales of 31,000 in the first week, making it the band's most successful album at the time of its release. The album also peaked at number one on the Billboard Top Independent Albums, Top Hard Rock Albums, and Christian Albums charts.

Track listing

Personnel 

The Devil Wears Prada
 Mike Hranica - lead vocals
 Chris Rubey - lead guitar
 Jeremy DePoyster - rhythm guitar, clean vocals, lead vocals on track 10
 Andy Trick - bass
 James Baney - keyboards, synthesizer, piano
 Daniel Williams - drums, percussion

Production
Engineered, mixed and mastered by Joey Sturgis
Produced by The Devil Wears Prada and Joey Sturgis
A&R by Carl Severson
Illustrations by Dan Seagrave
Layout by Sons of Nero

Charts

References

2009 albums
The Devil Wears Prada (band) albums
Ferret Music albums
Albums with cover art by Dan Seagrave
Albums with cover art by Sons of Nero
Albums produced by Joey Sturgis